The Diocese of Yakima is a Latin Church ecclesiastical territory or diocese of the Catholic Church in the central region of the U.S. state of Washington. Headquartered in Yakima, the diocese comprises Benton, Chelan, Douglas, Grant, Kittitas, Klickitat and Yakima Counties. The diocesan cathedral is St. Paul Cathedral, and the diocesan bishop is Joseph J. Tyson. The diocese is a suffragan see in the ecclesiastical province of the metropolitan Archdiocese of Seattle, and its metropolitan archbishop is Paul Etienne, Archbishop of Seattle.

History
The diocese was canonically erected on June 23, 1951 by Pope Pius XII. Its territory was taken from the territory of the Dioceses of Seattle (which was concurrently elevated to an archdiocese) and Spokane. The diocese currently has 41 parishes and 7 Catholic schools.

In 2011, under Bishop Joseph Tyson, the Diocese of Yakima began a migrant ministry program in which every seminarian assists and ministers to migrant workers. This was inspired by the Youth Migrant Project in Burlington, Washington, in the Archdiocese of Seattle, where Bishop Tyson had been involved in ministry in his youth.

On March 7, 2020, Fr. Alejandro Trejo, pastor of Our Lady of the Desert parish in Mattawa, Washington, became the first priest in the United States to be diagnosed with COVID-19 during the coronavirus pandemic.

Bishops of Yakima
The list of bishops of the diocese and their years of service:
 Joseph Patrick Dougherty (1951–1969)
 Cornelius Michael Power (1969–1974), appointed Archbishop of Portland in Oregon
 Nicolas Eugene Walsh (1974–1976), appointed auxiliary bishop of Seattle
 William Stephen Skylstad (1977–1990), appointed Bishop of Spokane
 Francis George, O.M.I. (1990–1996), appointed Archbishop of Portland in Oregon and later Archbishop of Chicago (elevated to Cardinal in 1998)
 Carlos Arthur Sevilla, S.J. (1996–2011)
 Joseph J. Tyson (2011–present)

Schools
 La Salle High School, Union Gap
 Christ the teacher Catholic school, Yakima - Grades PK-8
 St. Joseph/Marquette School, Yakima - Grades PK-8
 St. Joseph School, Kennewick, WA - Grades PK-8
 Christ the King School, Richland, WA - Grades K-8
 St. Rose of Lima School, Ephrata, WA - Grades PK-6
 St. Joseph School, Wenatchee, WA - Grades PK-5

See also

 Catholic Church by country
 Catholic Church in the United States
 Ecclesiastical Province of Seattle
 Global organisation of the Catholic Church
 List of Roman Catholic archdioceses (by country and continent)
 List of Roman Catholic dioceses (alphabetical) (including archdioceses)
 List of Roman Catholic dioceses (structured view) (including archdioceses)
 List of the Catholic dioceses of the United States

References

External links
Roman Catholic Diocese of Yakima Official Site

 
Yakima
Christian organizations established in 1951
Yakima
Yakima
1951 establishments in Washington (state)